Metz Airport may refer to:

 Lumsden (Metz) Airport, in Saskatchewan, Canada
 Metz–Nancy–Lorraine Airport, in Lorraine, France